Mian Mikaal Patras Zulfiqar (born 5 September 1981), commonly known as Mikaal Zulfiqar, is a British-Pakistani actor and former model. He has appeared in a number of Pakistani television series. He has also acted in a few Indian films and is currently active in Pakistani films. He is one of the highest paid Pakistani actors. In 2015, he won the Best Actor (Popular) Award at Hum TV Awards due to his performance in television series Mohabat Subh Ka Sitara Hai.

Born in London, he moved to Pakistan and initially began his career as a model in early 2000s, and caught attention of the team of Abrar-ul-Haq who cast him in the singer's music video for Sanu Tere Naal Pyar Ho Gya. He made his film debut in 2007 with Bollywood crime thriller film Godfather, followed by starring roles in Shoot on Sight (2008), U R My Jaan (2011) and Baby (2015). He also began his film career in Pakistan with a supporting character in critically acclaimed film Cake (2018). Zulfiqar has since played leading roles in Na Band Na Baraati (2018) and Sherdil (2019).

He entered the Pakistani television industry with drama series Saiqa (2009). The hit series Pani Jaisa Piyar (2011) stabilize his position in television medium, and he went on to appear in a number of big-budget dramas, with most notable of them include Shehr-e-Zaat (2012), Saat Pardon Mein (2012), Mirat-ul-Uroos (2012–2013), Mohabat Subh Ka Sitara Hai (2013–2014), Diyar-e-Dil (2015), Sang-e-Mar Mar (2016–2017) and Alif Allah Aur Insaan (2017–2018).

Early life 
Zulfiqar was born on 5 September 1981 in London, United Kingdom and has six siblings. After spending his early years in London, he moved to Pakistan and attended the Lahore Lyceum school in Lahore. Additionally, he also began his career as a model and started modelling for commercials and videos which were relevant to acting.

Career 
After several advertising campaigns, Zulfiqar appeared in Sanu Tere Naal Pyar Ho Gya, a song from Bay Ja Cycle Tay music album by Abrar-ul-Haq.

Zulfiqar is known for his appearance in comedy commercials for Ufone. He has also performed in Bollywood films; crime thriller film Godfather in 2007, the drama film Shoot on Sight in 2008, the musical-romantic U R My Jaan in 2011, and the spy thriller Baby in 2015. However, in an interview, he stated that he didn't dream of working in Bollywood further.

After having a successful career in modelling, Zulfiqar stepped into the television industry. Some of his early screenwork includes Saiqa, Kaisay Kahoon, Pani Jaisa Piyar, and Jal Pari, among others.

He won Best Actor title in Hum TV Awards held in Dubai in April, 2015, for his role in the drama serial Mohabat Subh Ka Sitara Hai. He also acted in popular show Shehr-e-Zaat opposite Mahira Khan.

He has performed in many dramas opposite actress Saba Qamar as protagonist, including Pani Jaisa Piyar, Sangat, and Mein Sitara.

In 2015, he played the role of Behroz Bakhtiyar Khan in romantic drama Diyar-e-Dil. Dawn praised Zulfiqar's performance and wrote, ''Meekal has finally chosen a role with depth as Behroz after a series of pot boilers. He looks amazing and reminds viewers again that he is the talented actor who could play the devil-may-care Shamraiz from Kuch Pyar ka Pagalpan or the self-absorbed, brooding Salman Ansar from Sheher-e-Zaat.'' Diyar-e-Dil was also well received by viewers.

In 2017, he was highly appreciated for his performance in spiritual television series Alif Allah Aur Insaan. The series became one of the most-watched shows of 2017.

In March 2018, he made a special appearance in film Cake, co-starring Aamina Sheikh, Adnan Malik and Sanam Saeed. The film was highly lauded by critics. His next film Na Band Na Baraati was released in June 2018. He said in an interview that doing that film was his way to support foreign investment in local cinema.

In 2019, he was seen in Pakistani war film Sherdil opposite Armeena Khan. The film and Zulfiqar's performance received mostly unfavourable reviews from critics. Nevertheless, the film became Zulfiqar's first major box-office success, and grossed Rs. 5.17 crore in the first five days of its release.

Personal life 

Mikaal's full birth name is Mian Muhammad Mikaal Patras Aziz Zulfiqar. His father is a retired Pakistani diplomat and his mother is British. His parents separated when Zulfiqar was 17 years old. He has two older sisters, one of whom lives in Australia and a younger brother, Jamal Andreas Zulfiqar, who is a prominent theatre actor in London.

Mikaal's first relationship was with Pakistani film actress Zara Sheikh.

Zulfiqar got engaged to model Sara Bhatti in 2010. They got married in 2012 and have two daughters. In March 2017, Zulfiqar announced on his Facebook page that he and Bhatti had officially divorced.

Media image 
Mikaal is listed among the ″top 10 most beautiful men of Pakistan″. In 2017, he was one of the highest-paid television actors in the country.

In 2017, he was one of the most in-demand actors of Pakistani films and was offered a number of films. He signed five films that year.

Filmography

Film

Television

Awards and nominations

See also 
 List of Lollywood actors

References

External links 
 

Pakistani male television actors
Living people
Pakistani male models
Male actors from Karachi
Pakistani male film actors
British film actors of Pakistani descent
English male film actors
English male television actors
1981 births
Pakistani people of English descent